Daniel Mesenhöler (born 24 July 1995) is a German professional footballer who plays as a goalkeeper for Hallescher FC.

Career
Mesenhöler made his professional debut for Union Berlin on 26 October 2016, in the second round of the 2016–17 edition of the DFB-Pokal, against Bundesliga club Borussia Dortmund. Mesenhöler started the match and played the full 120 minutes. The away match finished as a 1–1 draw after extra time, with Union losing 3–0 on penalties. Mesenhöler failed to make a save in the shootout, and all three Union players missed their penalties.

He signed for MSV Duisburg for the 2018–19 season. A year later, he joined Viktoria Köln.

On 24 September 2021, he joined Hallescher FC for the 2021–22 season.

Career statistics

References

External links

1995 births
Living people
People from Oberbergischer Kreis
Sportspeople from Cologne (region)
German footballers
Footballers from North Rhine-Westphalia
Association football goalkeepers
Germany youth international footballers
1. FC Köln II players
1. FC Köln players
1. FC Union Berlin players
MSV Duisburg players
FC Viktoria Köln players
Heracles Almelo players
Hallescher FC players
2. Bundesliga players
3. Liga players
Regionalliga players
German expatriate footballers
German expatriate sportspeople in the Netherlands
Expatriate footballers in the Netherlands